Sheridan Gilley (born 27 April 1945) is an Australian author and historian.

Biography 

He was born on 27 April 1945 in Brisbane, Australia.

He is the son of Wayne Grover Gilley, a journalist and his wife Betty Margaret Gilley.

He got married to Margaret Mary Haworth a health care executive and vicar on June 15, 1974, and had two children with her.

Education  

He completed his bachelor's degree at the University of Queensland in 1966 and his PhD at the University of Cambridge in 1971.

Career 

He served as a lecturer in ecclesiastical history at the University of St. Andrews from 1971 to 1978.

He is currently a reader emeritus at the University of Durham since 2002.

Awards and honours 

He became a fellow/member of the Royal Historical Society and the Ecclesiastical History Society.

Bibliography 

His notable books include:

 Loss and Gain: The Story of a Convert
 The Beauty of Holiness and the Holiness of Beauty: Art, Sanctity, and the Truth of Catholicism
 The Cambridge History of Christianity, Volume 8: World Christianities, c.1815 - c.1914
 Newman And His Age
 The Irish in Britain 1815-1931
 Victorian Churches and Churchmen: Essays Presented to Vincent Alan McClelland
 A Short History of Religion in Britain

References

External links 
 Biography 1
 WorldCat page

Australian writers
Australian historians
1945 births
Living people